José Maria Mendes Ribeiro Norton de Matos, GCTE, GCL (23 March 1867 in Ponte de Lima, Portugal – 3 January 1955 in Ponte de Lima) was a Portuguese general and politician.

1880s
After attending college in Braga, and attending the Escola Académica in Lisbon in 1880, Norton de Matos became part of the mathematics faculty at the University of Coimbra in 1884. He later went to military school and, in 1898, departed for Portuguese India. There, he began his career in colonial administration.

1910s-1920s
Norton de Matos' return to Portugal coincided with the transformation of the political system of Portugal into a republic. He was prepared to serve the new regime, and he soon became the chief of staff of the 5th military division. In 1912 he gained the post of governor-general of Angola. His leadership was considered instrumental in protecting the Portuguese colony from foreign powers such as Britain, Germany and France.

Norton de Matos was recalled to Portugal in 1915 due to a new political situation that arose in Portugal during the First World War and named Minister of War. In this capacity, he was responsible for organizing the Portuguese intervention on the Western Front.

In 1917, Norton de Matos exiled himself to London after disagreements with the new republic. He later returned and became the Portuguese delegate to the Paris Peace Conference, which led to the Treaty of Versailles. Later he returned to Angola as High Commissioner of the Republic, from 1921 to 1923, before becoming Portuguese ambassador to the United Kingdom from 1923 to 1926. In 1929 he was elected a Grand Master of the Masons in Portugal.

1940s
Norton de Matos returned to teaching, accepting a position as professor at the Instituto Superior Técnico, but was dismissed from his chair. He then became a leading opposition figure against the Salazar regime. In 1943, he was named to the National Council of Movement of National Antifascist Unity, or MUNAF, and on his 81st birthday, he was named the candidate of the opposition now united under the Movement of Democratic Unity (MUD, the successor organization to the MUNAF after 1945) for President in the election of 1949, under the dictatorial Estado Novo regime, while demanding freedom to advertise his message and the close inspection of votes. The regime refused these demands, and Norton de Matos withdrew from the election on 12 February 1949.

Despite his fierce opposition to Salazar, Norton de Matos also defended Portuguese colonialism but in a more progressive way. In 1953 he published a book titled “Africa Nossa” (“Our Africa”) where he made an appeal for policies that would promote massive territorial occupation by Portuguese white settlers in Africa and at the same time support the gradual assimilation of the African populations.

Norton de Matos continued to lead a democratic opposition movement centered in the city of Oporto. He died in his hometown in 1955.

References

Portuguese colonial governors and administrators
Portuguese generals
1867 births
1955 deaths
Candidates for President of Portugal
Portuguese anti-fascists
Portuguese military personnel of World War I
Ambassadors of Portugal to the United Kingdom
Governors of Portuguese Angola
1910s in Angola
1940s in Angola
Portuguese Freemasons
People from Huambo
People from Ponte de Lima
20th-century Portuguese politicians
Portuguese people of British descent
Recipients of the Order of the Tower and Sword